Juglar may refer to:

A synonym for jongleur or jester
Juglar, defunct Champagne house in 1829 merged into Jacquesson
Juglar cycle, fixed investment cycle

People:
Clément Juglar (1819–1905), French doctor and statistician